HMS Mulgrave was a 74-gun third rate ship of the line of the Royal Navy, launched on 1 January 1812 at Upnor.

Mulgrave was hulked in 1836, and broken up in 1854.

Notes

References

Lavery, Brian (2003) The Ship of the Line - Volume 1: The development of the battlefleet 1650-1850. Conway Maritime Press. .

Ships of the line of the Royal Navy
Vengeur-class ships of the line
1812 ships
Ships built on the River Medway